Homoeosoma calcella is a species of snout moth in the genus Homoeosoma. It was described by Ragonot in 1887. It is found in Russia and Bulgaria.

The wingspan is about 24 mm.

References

Moths described in 1887
Phycitini
Moths of Europe
Moths of Asia